The 13th Infantry Division was a military formation of the Korean People's Army during the 20th Century.

It participated in the North Korean advance from Seoul to Daejeon.

The division fought in the Battle of Pusan Perimeter.

References

InfDiv0013
InfDiv0013NK